UAC may refer to:

Computing 
 User Account Control, a security feature in Microsoft Windows
 Session Initiation Protocol#User agent client

Organizations 
 Ulster Army Council, 1973 Northern Ireland loyalist paramilitary group
 Undeb Amaethwyr Cymru, the Farmer's Union of Wales
 Unemployment Action Center, a non-profit organization in New York City, US
 United Apostolic Church
 Union of Catholic Apostolate
 Université d’Abomey-Calavi, part of the National University of Benin
 United Africa Company, 20th-century British company
 United Africa Company of Nigeria, formerly a subsidiary of United Africa Company
 United Aircraft Corporation, Russian aerospace and defense company
 United Arab Command, of the Arab League
 Universities Admissions Centre, Australia
Urban Appalachian Council, Cincinnati, US

Other 
 Unaccompanied Alien Children, United States government classification for children in immigration custody
 Unified Arab Code, a Civil Code produced by the Arab League between 1988 and 1996
 Urban adult contemporary, radio music format
 Union Aerospace Corporation, fictional military contractor in the Doom video game franchise
 UAC, a codon for the amino acid tyrosine